Kiuru is a Finnish surname, meaning "skylark". Notable people with the surname include:

 August Kiuru (1922–2009), Finnish cross-country skier
 Pauli Kiuru (born 1962), Finnish triathlete and politician
 Krista Kiuru (born 1974), Finnish politician
 Tami Kiuru (born 1976), Finnish ski jumper

Finnish-language surnames